A cigarette holder is a fashion accessory, a slender tube in which a cigarette is held for smoking. Most frequently made of silver, jade or bakelite (popular in the past but now wholly replaced by modern plastics), cigarette holders were considered an essential part of ladies' fashion from the early 1910s through early to the mid 1970s.

Purpose
The holder was a practical accessory and served several purposes:

 The primary use was to prevent ash falling onto a woman's clothes, especially since women didn't wear smoking jackets. This is also why longer holders were for more formal occasions, which usually had more elaborate dress codes.
 Kept side-stream smoke further from the smoker's eyes and out from under the lady's hat, which often had a wider brim than a man's hat.
 Helped prevent nicotine staining the fingers and gloves.
 Reduced staining of the teeth.
 Kept the thin cigarette paper from sticking to, and tearing on, the smoker's lips.
 Cooled and mellowed the smoke inhaled.
 Holders sometimes encased a filter for taste and, later, health reasons.
 Before the advent of filtered cigarettes in the 1960s, the holder also kept tobacco flakes out of the smoker's mouth.

Appearance

Materials

Cigarette holders range from the simplest, single-material constructs to incredibly ornate objects with complex inlays of metal and gemstones. Rarer examples of these can be found in enamel, horn, tortoiseshell, or more precious materials such as amber and ivory.

A similar holder made of wood, meerschaum or bakelite and with an amber mouthpiece was used for cigars and was a popular accessory for men from the Edwardian period until the 1920s.

Size

As with evening gloves, ladies' cigarette holders are measured by four traditional formal standard lengths:
 opera length, usually 16 to 20 inches/40 to 50 cm
 theatre length, 10 to 14 inches/25 to 35 cm
 dinner length, 4 to 6 inches/10 to 15 cm
 cocktail length, which includes shorter holders

Traditionally, men's cigarette holders were no more than 4 inches long.

Notable users

Well-known women who used cigarette holders include Audrey Hepburn, Lucille Ball, Jayne Mansfield, Jacqueline Kennedy, Rita Hayworth, Princess Margaret, Wendy Richard, Madalena Barbosa, Natalie Wood, Louise Brooks, and Ayn Rand. Scarlett Johansson is a contemporary example.

Among the best-known men who used cigarette holders were Franklin D. Roosevelt, Ivor Novello, Enrico Caruso, Vladimir Horowitz, Ian Fleming, Noël Coward, Hunter S. Thompson (though he regarded his as only a filter, using the TarGard filter), Tennessee Williams, Peter O’Toole, Fulgencio Batista, Sergei Rachmaninoff, Josip Broz Tito, and Hans von Bülow.

Cultural references 
Holders can be seen in period films like Titanic, and in films of the 1950s and 1960s. Holly Golightly, the naïve and eccentric café society girl portrayed by Audrey Hepburn in the 1961 classic Breakfast at Tiffany's, is famously seen carrying an oversized cigarette holder; the image of Hepburn wearing the famous Givenchy little black dress and with the foot-long cigarette holder in her hand, is considered one of the most iconic images of 20th-century American cinema. Lucille Ball can be seen using one in certain episodes of I Love Lucy. In Troop Beverly Hills, Shelly Long's character is seen throughout the movie using one. Cruella de Vil is seen using one repeatedly in the 1961 animated Disney film One Hundred and One Dalmatians and in the 1996 remake, in which she is portrayed by Glenn Close. Margo Lane (portrayed by Penelope Ann Miller) used one in The Shadow, as did Jade in Jonny Quest. Comedian Phyllis Diller had a stage persona which included holding a long cigarette holder from which she pretended to smoke (though she was a non-smoker in real life).

Fictional Peter Pan character Captain Hook possessed a unique double-holder, which allowed him to smoke two cigars (not cigarettes) at once. 

Batman's nemesis The Penguin also commonly uses a cigarette holder in the comics, the 1960s television series, the live-action film Batman Returns, the 1990s television series, and Harley Quinn. Edna Mode from the Incredibles franchise is often seen with an unlit cigarette holder.

Johnny Depp uses a cigarette holder in his role as Raoul Duke (alter ego of gonzo journalist Hunter S. Thompson) in the film Fear and Loathing in Las Vegas.  In cartoons, the Pink Panther, Colonel Sponsz from The Adventures of Tintin, and Jade from Jonny Quest used cigarette holders.

The lyrics to "Satin Doll", by Duke Ellington, and the cover art of the album Badfinger feature a cigarette holder. The video to "Into the Great Wide Open", by Tom Petty and the Heartbreakers, features Faye Dunaway using her cigarette holder as a magic wand.

Rachel Menken, a character on the AMC series Mad Men, smokes cigarettes with a short holder.

Bet Lynch, a character from Coronation Street, smoked her cigarettes with a cigarette holder during her times as the landlady of the Rovers Return Inn.

See also
 Cigarette case
 Fashion brands (cigarettes)

References

External links

Tobacciana
Fashion accessories
Holders